Several riots have occurred in New York City's Tompkins Square Park, including:

1874 Tompkins Square Park riot
1988 Tompkins Square Park riot